Callala Beach is a small town on the South Coast of New South Wales, Australia in the City of Shoalhaven. Like most beaches in Jervis Bay, it is known to have brilliantly white sand and aqua blue waters. The beach is a tourist spot and is a 2.5-hour drive from Sydney, located to its south.

Geography
The town is situated on the northern shore of Jervis Bay about 20 minutes drive from Nowra and 10 minutes from Culburra Beach. Nearby settlements include Currarong to the south-east and Culburra Beach to the north-east.

Tourism
Local services include a popular Club with daily activities and entertainment, eighteen hole golf course, two bowling greens and auditorium for functions and bands. The area has a number of seaside motels. There is also a community hall.

Sport and recreation
Club Callala (Callala RSL Country Club)
Callala Beach Triathlon

See also
Hyams Beach, a beach to the south which also features crystal blue waters and fine white sand.

References

External links
Callala Beach Progress Association
Callala Business Chamber & Tourism Inc.
VISITNSW.com - Callala-Bay
Club Callala

Towns in the South Coast (New South Wales)
City of Shoalhaven
Bays of New South Wales
Seaside resorts in Australia
Tourist attractions in New South Wales
Beaches of New South Wales